Geraets-Smits v Stichting Ziekenfonds and Peerbooms v Stichting CZ Groep Zorgverzekeringen (2001) C-157/99 is an EU law case, concerning the free movement of services in the European Union.

Facts
Mrs Geraets-Smits claimed the refusal of reimbursement for treatment for Parkinson’s disease in Kassel, which she believed was better than that available in the Netherlands by focusing on individual symptoms, was contrary to TFEU article 56. Mr Peerbooms received neurostimulation treatment in Innsbruck, which likewise would not have been covered in the Netherlands. Experts testified in both cases that it was unjustified or experimental. Dutch social insurance covered medical costs of low income people, but only if it was approved. Funding came from individual premiums, from the state, and some from other private insurance funds. Geraets-Smits and Peerbooms had paid up front in Germany and Austria. Dutch law said authorisation had required that (1) treatment had to be regarded as ‘normal in the professional circles concerned’, and (2) ‘necessary’ so that adequate care could not be provided without undue delay by a care provider in the home state. The prior authorisation requirement was challenged as being contrary to TFEU article 56. Governments submitted that hospital services were not an economic activity if it was provided free of charge under a sickness insurance scheme.

Judgment
The Court of Justice held that member states could organise their social security systems, if it was compatible with EU law rules. Article 57 did not require services to be paid for by those who received it, for it to fall within article 56 - and thus a restriction required justification. However the restrictions in these cases could be justified in the interests of maintaining social security’s financial balance, or essential health reasons under TFEU article 52.

See also

European Union law

Notes

References

European Union services case law
Parkinson's disease
Neurostimulation
2001 in case law
Healthcare in the Netherlands